This is a list of all  officially released games for the Atari 5200 Super System, organized alphabetically by name. This list excludes any hobbyist-developed games. See Lists of video games for related lists.

Games

Gremlins was the last game released by Atari for the 5200.

Later releases
Tempest (Atari Age) - 2013
Millipede (Atari Age) - 2017
Zaxxon 32k version (Atari Age) -

These games for the 5200 were published through the Atari Age store.

References

See also

Atari 5200
 
Atari